The Lorraine Hanriot LH.130 is a French racing aircraft designed and built in the early 1930s, to compete in the Coupe Michelin air races.

Design and development
Following on from the earlier Lorraine Hanriot LH.42 racing aircraft, Monsieur Louis Montlaur, at the behest of Lorraine Hanriot's parent organisation, the Société Générale Aéronautique (SGA), designed an aircraft with metal structure and skinning of similar layout to the LH.42. The mid-set monoplane wings had a single metal spar supporting wooden ribs which were fabric covered aft of the metal-skinned leading edge. The fuselage was a built up Duralumin structure with sheet metal skinning

The undercarriage consisted of strut mounted wide-track main gear with faired wheels, Hanriot Spécial oleo-pneumatic shock-absorbers and a steel tail skid.

Power for the HL.130 was supplied by a single  Lorraine 9Nb 9-cylinder radial engine (serial no. 62003), driving a two-bladed fixed-pitch Levasseur Series 401M propeller (serial no. 5378), cowled with a close fitting NACA cowling .

The 1933 Coupe Michelin air race was to be held from 1 March to 31 October 1933, but the race regulations were changed early in 1933 removing limitations on engine power and increasing the course length. The LH.130 was not competitive and was withdrawn from the competition.

LH.131
To comply with the new regulations Lorraine Hanriot re-designed and converted the LH.130 to be powered by a  Gnome-Rhône 9 Kbrs Mistral supercharged engine, designated LH.131-01. A semi-enclosed cockpit was also introduced along with other improvements; such as increased control surface area and an attempt at boundary layer control in the region of the cockpit; using small holes in the skin to allow turbulent air to be drawn into the fuselage.

After failing to compete in the 1933 Coupe Michelin, Lorraine Hanriot developed the LH.131 further by adding a retractable undercarriage. The main gear folded rearwards into nacelles under the wings, similar to the Seversky P-35, unfortunately this was manually actuated which required considerable effort from the pilot and was also a distraction at a critical stage in flight. Power for the LH.131-02 was provided by a  Lorraine Algol Major.

Operational history
Before the first flight, the LH.130-01 was displayed at the XIII-th Paris Air Salon (Salon  Aéronautique Paris), held from 18 November to 4 December 1932, eliciting a visit form French President Albert Lebrun. After the Salon ended the aircraft was transferred to Villacoublay where the first flight took place on 22 December 1932.

Flight testing revealed vibration from the engine mounts, which were reinforced and a certificate of airworthiness was issued on 12 May 1933 along with the civil registration F-AOFV.

Flight testing of the LH.131 prototypes failed to demonstrate advantage over the competition, so aspirations for the LH.131 filling the fighter-trainer or mail-plane roles did not bear fruit. Attempts to break records for speed over a closed circuit in late 1933 failed due to bad weather, after which the LH.131 was largely abandoned.

Variants
LH.130-01 The first prototype, powered by a  Lorraine 9Nb 9-cylinder radial engine. Converted to the LH.131-01 after changes to the regulations for the Coupe Michelin air races in 1933.
LH.131-01The LH.130 modified with a  Gnome-Rhône 9Kbrs Mistral, semi-enclosed cockpit, boundary layer control drag reduction measures and enlarged control surfaces.
LH.131-02The LH.131-01 modified to have a retractable main undercarriage, powered by a  Lorraine Algol Major (Type 120).

Specifications (LH.130)

References

Bibliography

External links
 Aviafrance LH.130

1930s French mailplanes
1930s French civil utility aircraft
Hanriot aircraft
Racing aircraft
Single-engined tractor aircraft
Mid-wing aircraft
Aircraft first flown in 1932